Luis Miguel del Risco Torres (born September 7, 1989) is a professional Italo-Colombian soccer player. He currently plays as a defender for Expreso Rojo.

CLub career
From 2008 to 2010, he played for Millionarios in the Copa Mustang.

External links
Profile at BDFA

1989 births
Living people
Sportspeople from Barranquilla
Colombian footballers
Millonarios F.C. players
Tigres F.C. footballers
Association football defenders